Kharrat Mahalleh (also Romanized as Kharrāţ Maḩalleh; also known as Khord Maḩalleh) is a village in Tulem Rural District, Tulem District, Sowme'eh Sara County, Gilan Province, Iran. At the 2006 census, its population was 483, in 119 families.

References 

Populated places in Sowme'eh Sara County